Branson Airport  is a public use airport located eight nautical miles (15 km) south-southeast of the central business district of Branson, a city in Taney County, Missouri, United States. Branson Airport, LLC is a private company operating the airport through an operating agreement with The Branson Regional Airport Transportation District. The airport is owned by Taney County, MO.

Branson Airport’s three-letter location identifier for IATA, is BKG This code should be used when looking up airline flights to/from Branson Airport. The three-letter location identifier from the FAA is BBG. This should be used by pilots when locating the airport.

The airport opened on May 11, 2009. As of 2023, only private airlines service the airfield.  There is one FBO on the field, named the Branson Jet Center. Two restaurants are located at the airport, one in the main terminal building with access to passengers flying in and out on commercial flights. The other restaurant is open to the public and is located at the Branson Jet Center.

Opening

The formal grand opening was May 8–10, 2009, during which the U.S. Air Force Thunderbirds performed during an air show. The first scheduled passenger flight arrived the following day, on May 11, 2009 from Minneapolis-St. Paul Airport operated by  Sun Country Airlines with a Boeing 737 jetliner.

There were two airlines operating at the time of Branson's opening, AirTran Airways and Sun Country Airlines. Besides AirTran and Sun Country, the airport has been served by Frontier Airlines and Southwest Airlines as well as several regional air carriers.

Flight history
Frontier Airlines launched flights to Branson Airport with daily service to Denver as well as less than daily service to Milwaukee, which was formerly served from Branson through AirTran.

ExpressJet also operated flights under an independent brand known as Branson Air Express to several markets utilizing Embraer ERJ-145 regional jets supporting point-to-point transit.

On February 23, 2011, Branson Airport's largest carrier at the time, AirTran Airways, announced additional flights from Branson to Baltimore, Chicago-Midway and Houston-Hobby. All flights were announced to be year round service.

As of August, 2012, Branson Airport was served with six nonstop departures a day with more than 100 possible connections.

On August 27, 2012, Southwest Airlines announced service to Branson and started service on March 9, 2013. Southwest flew Boeing 737 jetliners nonstop to Chicago-Midway, Dallas-Love, Houston-Hobby and previously flew Saturday only flights to Orlando–International. Southwest Airlines then ended all service into the airport on June 7, 2014.

On February 24, 2014, Frontier Airlines announced their expansion of Branson to Denver service on June 9, 2014. Seasonal service ended in October 2014. Frontier Airlines returned to Branson in the spring of 2018, having served the Branson market for a number of years since the airport opened in 2009.

On April 3, 2014, Buzz Airways, announced new nonstop service to both Chicago-Midway and Houston-Hobby airports that began June 12, 2014, replacing the lost Southwest Airlines service. As of December 2014, this service was operated by Elite Airways with Canadair CRJ regional jet aircraft.  Service to Chicago-Midway has since terminated.

On December 23, 2014, Branson AirExpress announced flights operated by Elite Airways and Buzz Airways will continue in 2015 to Chicago-Midway, (MDW) Houston-Hobby (HOU), Austin (AUS) and Denver (DEN).  On January 28, 2015, Branson AirExpress announced it would add an additional operator, Orange Air, flying McDonnell Douglas MD-80 jetliners nonstop to Cincinnati (CVG) and New Orleans (MSY) with direct, one stop service to Cancun, Mexico (CUN) via New Orleans from the Branson Airport starting May 6, 2015. On October 5, 2015 the Cincinnati leg of the Orange Air route was terminated, and the Branson-New Orleans-Cancun portion of the route was transferred to Elite Airways.

Elite Airways and Buzz Airways returned as the scheduled air service providers in 2016.

In 2017, the sole provider was Via Air, operating Embraer EMB-145 regional jets to several destinations. In October 2019, the airline declared bankruptcy and ceased all operations.  

In February 2018, Frontier Airlines announced it was returning to Branson with seasonal service to Denver (DEN) beginning June 13, 2018. However in 2023, Frontier announced they would not serve the airport for the coming season.

Facilities and aircraft 
It has one runway designated 14/32 with a concrete surface measuring 7,140 by 150 feet (2,176 x 46 m).

Airline and destination

Currently, there are no public commercial flights serving the airfield.

Development and construction

The construction of the airport, which involved the flattening of several Ozark Mountains, is claimed to be the largest earthmoving project in Missouri history. A press release noted that between groundbreaking in July 2007 and May 2008 11 million cubic yards of earth had been moved.

The $155 million cost of the building the terminal included $38 million in private equity and $117 million in tax free bonds underwritten by Citigroup. The high-risk, high-yield bonds (top rate of 6.5%) were issued by the Branson Regional Airport Transportation Development District. The City of Branson will pay a subsidy of $8.24 to Branson Airport LLC for each arriving visitor with an annual cap of $2 million.

The developer was Branson Airport, LLC and AFCO.  The Program Manager was Vasey Aviation Group LLC. The master designer was Burns and McDonnell Engineering. McAninch Corporation handled the earth moving operations. A local contractor Dewitt was the contractor handling the terminal construction.

See also

Nearby general aviation airports
 M. Graham Clark Downtown Airport
 Branson West Airport
 Boone County Airport (Arkansas)

Nearest commercial airports
 Springfield-Branson National Airport
 Northwest Arkansas Regional Airport
 Joplin Regional Airport

References

External links
 FlyBranson.com, official site
 
 

Airports in Missouri
Branson, Missouri micropolitan area
Buildings and structures in Taney County, Missouri
2009 establishments in Missouri